is a railway station in Kita-ku, Kobe, Hyōgo Prefecture, Japan.

Lines
Kobe Electric Railway
Ao Line
Arima Line

Adjacent stations

Sources

External links
 

Railway stations in Hyōgo Prefecture
Railway stations in Japan opened in 1928